Thogsennia is a genus of flowering plants belonging to the family Rubiaceae.

Its native range is Cuba to Hispaniola.

Species:
 Thogsennia lindeniana (A.Rich.) Aiello

References

Chiococceae
Rubiaceae genera